Fulvio Orsini (11 December 1529 – 18 May 1600) was an Italian humanist, historian, and archaeologist. He was a descendant of the Orsini family, one of the oldest, most illustrious, and for centuries most powerful of the Roman princely families, whose origins, when stripped of legend, can be traced back to a certain Ursus de Paro, recorded at Rome in 998.

Life
Orsini was the natural son of Maerbale Orsini of the line of Mugnano. Cast off by his father at the age of nine, he found a refuge among the choir boys of St. John Lateran, and a protector in Canon Gentile Delfini. He applied himself energetically to the study of the ancient languages, published a new edition of Arnobius and of the Septuagint, and wrote works dealing with the history of Rome.

Orsini brought together a large collection of antiquities and built up a costly library of manuscripts and books, including the Vergilius Vaticanus, which later became part of the Vatican library. Orsini became also a friend and patron of El Greco, while the painter was in Rome (1570–1577). Orsini's collection would later include seven paintings by the artist (View of Mt. Sinai and a portrait of Clovio are among them).

References

Footnotes

1529 births
1600 deaths
Writers from Rome
Fulvio
Italian Renaissance humanists
16th-century Italian writers